is a soccer video game, developed by Pandora Box and published by Banpresto, which was released exclusively in Japan in 1992.

This game features many popular Japanese franchise characters from the Godzilla, Ultraman, Kamen Rider and Gundam franchises.

Team Players

See also
Compati Hero Series
Dolucky's A-League Soccer
Mega Man Soccer

References

External links
 Battle Soccer at superfamicom.org
 Battle Soccer at super-famicom.jp 

1992 video games
Association football video games
Banpresto games
Crossover video games
Fantasy sports video games
Godzilla games
Gundam video games
Ultra Series video games
Japan-exclusive video games
Kamen Rider video games
Super Nintendo Entertainment System games
Super Nintendo Entertainment System-only games
Multiplayer and single-player video games
Video games developed in Japan